Roger Leonard Alfred Challis (born 3 August 1943) is an English former professional footballer of the 1960s.  He played professionally for Gillingham and Crewe Alexandra and made a total of 13 appearances in the Football League.

References

1943 births
English footballers
Association football forwards
English Football League players
Gillingham F.C. players
Crewe Alexandra F.C. players
People from Rochester, Kent
Living people